Bönen is a municipality in the district of Unna, in North Rhine-Westphalia, Germany. It is situated between Hamm in the north-east, Kamen in the west and Unna in the south. Bönen consists of the districts Altenbögge-Bönen, Bramey-Lenningsen, Flierich, Nordbögge, Osterbönen and Westerbönen.

Education 
Bönen has two primary schools, Hellwegschule and Goetheschule, and three secondary schools, Pestalozzi-Hauptschule, Humboldt-Realschule and Marie-Curie-Gymnasium. The family friendly environment and good education offerings attract increasing numbers of young families to Bönen.

Pestalozzi-Hauptschule 
The Pestalozzi-Hauptschule was founded in 1890 and received a quality certificate in 2009. The school has a partnership with Deutsche Bahn to inform children of job opportunities and support them in pursuing their careers.

Humboldt-Realschule 
This school has the longest history among the schools in Bönen, as it was founded in 1840. It has a broad offering of afternoon activities like sports and music.

Marie-Curie-Gymnasium 
Marie-Curie-Gymnasium was founded in 1999 and started off with two teachers and 66 pupils. 2008 this first year celebrated its Abitur. It has an excellent reputation and even attracts pupils from the neighbour cities Unna and Hamm.

Notable people
 Stefan Heinig (born 1962), CEO of Kik
 Joshua Filler (born 1997), Professional Pool Player

Gallery

References 

 
Unna (district)